Icy Colors Change is the second extended play recording, and the first holiday project, by American rapper Azealia Banks, released on 20 December 2018 through eOne Music. It contains jazz-infused songs.

Background
"Icy Colors Change" was conceived after the widespread coverage of the release of the title track on December 26, 2017, which sampled "Airglow Fires" by Lone, a long time collaborator of Banks. "I will re-release this on vinyl fully mixed and mastered next Christmas [as] it’s a work in progress as a part of a full holiday project I've been working on." Banks also recorded a pop punk cover of "Sleigh Ride" which her label at the time, eOne, removed from the electronic version of the EP.

Track listing
Credits adapted from Tidal.

References 

2018 EPs
Azealia Banks EPs
2018 Christmas albums
Christmas albums by American artists
Christmas EPs